Amancay Urbani (born 7 December 1991) is an Argentine footballer who plays as a midfielder for Spanish Segunda División Pro club Alavés Gloriosas and the Argentina women's national team.

International career
Urbani represented Argentina at the 2006 FIFA U-20 Women's World Championship. She made her senior debut at the 2010 South American Women's Football Championship and also appeared at the 2011 Pan American Games and the 2018 Copa América Femenina.

References

1991 births
Living people
Sportspeople from Santa Fe Province
Argentine women's footballers
Women's association football midfielders
Women's association football forwards
Belgrano (women) players
Deportivo Alavés Gloriosas players
Segunda Federación (women) players
Argentina women's youth international footballers
Argentina women's international footballers
Pan American Games competitors for Argentina
Footballers at the 2011 Pan American Games
Argentine expatriate women's footballers
Argentine expatriate sportspeople in Spain
Expatriate women's footballers in Spain